Poul Richard Høj Jensen "PRHJ" (born 2 June 1944) is a Danish sailor, boatbuilder, sailmaker and Olympic champion. PRHJ lives with his wife Sophia alternating in Burnham on Crouch and Freetown, Antigua and Barbuda.

Personal life
Married with two children, two step children; seven grand children to date.
Trained in mechanical engineering.

Professional career
After completing National Service in the Danish Navy, PRHJ worked for Paul Elvstrøm and Hans Fogh in the sail, mast and boatbuilding business. Left the company 15 years later to set up sail making business with Hans Fogh and subsequently started his own Company "Hoj Jensen Design" which became the North Sails Scandinavia franchise.  In 1989 the sailmaking business merged with Petticrows in Burnham on Crouch UK and he concentrated on building One Design Boats; Dragons mainly. As PRHJ was involved in the nautical business, he was for many years formally (rules of International Olympic Committee & World Sailing) considered a professional sailor. However he was he never paid to sail, he also worked during his four Olympic Campaigns with little or no sponsorship. PRHJ considers himself to be a gifted amateur.

Olympics
PRHJ participated in four consecutive Olympics from 1968. He won a gold medal in the Soling class at the 1976 Summer Olympics in Montreal, and again at the 1980 Summer Olympics in Moscow.

Palmarès
The Palmarès of PRHJ is extensive. Therefore the following criteria are used (with the exception of the Olympics where all results are listed):
 International championships with 45 boats or more
 National (country) championships as sanctioned by National Authorities.
 World, European Championships and Gold Cups as sanctioned by World Sailing.
 Only first places are noted, except for World, European and Championships where some 2nd and 3rd places are included.

Honours
Knighted by the Queen of Denmark in 2001.
German Dragon Class, Gold Dragon presented by Queen Silvia of Sweden 15th July 2009.
KDY 1976 Sportsman of the year Scandinavia
RYS Yachtsman of the year 2009.
Honorable Member Danish Dragon Club.
 Olympic Games
 7th, 1968 Olympics, Acapulco,  – FD (Where he replaced Hans Fogh in race 7). With Niels Jensen.
 7th, 1972 Olympics, Kiel-Schilksee,  – Dragon. With Frank Hoj-Jensen and Gunner Dahlgaard.
 Gold, 1976 Olympics, Kingston,  – Soling. With Erik Hansen and Valdemar Bandolowski.
 Gold, 1980 Olympics, Tallinn,  – Soling. With Erik Hansen and Valdemar Bandolowski.
World Championships
Half Ton 
1st, 1972 . With Paul Elvstrom (helm), Strit Johanssen, Valdemar Bandolowski, Jan Kjærulff
Quarter Ton 
1st, 1987. With Bent Folke Larsen, Steen Larsen and Erik Lund
1st, 1988. With Bent Folke Larsen, Steen Larsen and Theis Palm
2nd, 1986. With Bent Folke Larsen, Steen Larsen and Theis Palm
Etchells 
1st, 1997 . With Paul Blowers and Steve Mitchell
3rd, 2001 . With Paul Blowers and Steve Mitchell
Dragon 
1st, 1989 . With Erik Hansen, Jan Persson
1st, 2009 , Medemblik. With Theis Palm, Lars Jensen
2nd, 1993 . With Theis Palm, Lars Jensen
2nd, 1995 , Perth. With Claus Hoj Jensen, Richie Goldsmith
2nd, 1997 , Marstrand
3rd, 1985 , Douarnenez
H-Boat 
1st, 1980 . With Henrik Reese and Theis Palm
1st, 1983 . With Henrik Reese and Henrik Montin Sorenson 
2nd, 1981. With Henrik Reese and Theis Palm
Soling 
2nd, 1973 
2nd, 1979 
Master World Championships
Etchells 
1st, 2001 , Lymington. With Paul Blowers and Steve Mitchell
Corinthian World Championships
Dragon 
1st, 2013 , Weymouth. With Hamish McKay and Andrew Norden
European Championships
6 Metre 
2nd Classic Division, 2016 , Brunnen. With Colin Murray, Alexea Barrier, Hamish McKay and Jana Zimmerhalk
Etchells 
1st, 1997 , Lake Garda. With Paul Blowers and Steve Mitchell
1st, 1999 , Douarnenez. With Paul Blowers and Steve Mitchell
Dragon 
1st, 1969 , Lake Thun. With Axel Holm (helm)
1st, 1988 , Skovshoved. With Erik Hansen and Finn Jorgenson
1st, 1992 , Hanko. With Ebbe Elmer and Carsten Errebo
1st, 1996 , Pwllheli. With Morton Nielson and Chris Brittain
1st, 2000 , Laredo. With Claus Hoj Jensen and Morteon Harmson
2nd, 1994 , Cazaux. With Claus Hoj Jensen and Hamish McKay
2nd, 2005 , La Trinite sur Mer. With Phillipe Skate Holm and Chris Brittain
3rd, 1987 , Helsinki. With Prince Henrik (helm) and Jacob Johanssen
H-Boat 
1st, 1978. With Henrik Reese and Flemming Ipsen
1st, 1979
Soling 
1st, 1982 , Dragør. With Hans Fogh (helm) and John Kerr
Gold Cups
Dragon 
1st, 1990 , Dublin. With Erik Hansen
1st, 1992 , Ostend
1st, 1994 , Rungsted
1st, 1997 , Dublin. With Hamish McKay and Chris Britten
1st, 2008 , Cascais. With Theis Palm and Andrew Norden
Corinthian Dragon Gold Cups 
1st, 2014 , Medemblik. With Hamish McKay and Andrew Norden
Asia Pacific Championships Etchells 
 1st, 1995  Hong Kong. With Claus Hoj Jensen and Nick Geaves
One Ton Cup
1st, 1990 , Marstrand. With Henrik Søderlund (skipper)
Nordic Championships
IF-Boat (previously International Folkboat)
1st, 1975
Soling 
1st, 1981. With Theis Palm and Lille Keld Christensen
H-Boat 
1st, 1977. With Henrik Reese and Flemming Ipsen
1st, 1978
1st, 1982
Dragon 
1st, 1972
1st, 1991 , Ålesund. With Steen Larson and Jan Eld
Star 
2nd, 1982
Finn 
2nd, 1968
National Championships 
Antigua and Barbuda 
2008, 2009, Dragon
Danish 
1972, Trapeze
1976, Spackhugger
1973, 1979, 1980, 1982, Soling
1977, 1978, 1980, 1981, 1985, H-Boat
1963, 1966, 1968, OK Dinghy
1987, 1988, 1991, Dragon
Egypt 
1998, Dragon
Finland 
1980, H-Boat
France 
1991, 1995, 1997, Dragon
German 
1984, H-Boat
1992, 1994, 1995, Dragon
Great Britain 
1998, 1995, Etchells
1993, 1996, 2002, 2005, 2006, Dragon
Italy 
 1999, Etchells
Ireland 
1970, 1993, 1994, 1998, 1999, 2000, 2002, 2004, 2012, Dragon
Japan 
 1986, Half Ton
 1992, Dragon Prince Henrik (helm)
The Netherlands 
1997, 2001, 2011, Dragon
Russia 
1994, 2000, Dragon
Sweden 
1992, Dragon
Other Major Regatta's per Class 
115' Bruce Farr ketch
2011, Nelson Trophy
Dragon
1969, 2003, 2008, 2012, Princess Sophia, Spain, Mallorca
1972, 1999, Kieler Woche, Germany
1991, 1992, 2001, 2003,Regatte Royale, France, Cannes
1995, 1996, 1997, Grand Prix Samsonite, Spain, Blanes
1995, 1998, 2005, 2006, 2007, Henrique Navigator, Portugal, Vilamoura/Lisboa
1999, Cowes Week, UK
2000, 2011, 2012, La Baule Derby, France
2001, Baltic Regatta
2001, 2002, Copa Mediterania Mallorca, Spain
2002, 2004, Grand Prix Douarnenez, France
2002, Drags Cup Cazaux
2005, 2006, King Juan Carlos Cup
2006, Iberian Championship
H-Boat
1978, 1979, Kieler Woche, Germany
Soling
1976, Ski Yachting, France, Cannes
1980, Kieler Woche, Germany
Other Races Special for PRHJ 
Sjaelland Rundt
1963, Overall winner in Paul Elvstrøm's "Bess"
1965, 1st. With his father C. J. Hoj Jensen, his brother Frank Hoj Jensen and Ussing Andersen

See also
 List of Olympic medalists in sailing

References

External links

1944 births
Living people
Danish male sailors (sport)
Olympic sailors of Denmark
Olympic gold medalists for Denmark
Olympic silver medalists for Denmark
Olympic medalists in sailing
Medalists at the 1968 Summer Olympics
Medalists at the 1976 Summer Olympics
Medalists at the 1980 Summer Olympics
Sailors at the 1968 Summer Olympics – Dragon
Sailors at the 1968 Summer Olympics – Flying Dutchman
Sailors at the 1972 Summer Olympics – Dragon
Sailors at the 1976 Summer Olympics – Soling
Sailors at the 1980 Summer Olympics – Soling
H-boat class sailors
Sportspeople from Copenhagen
European Champions Soling